is a Japanese voice actress. She was formerly affiliated with Office Kaoru and is now affiliated with Ken Production.

Filmography

Television animation

Original video animation (OVA)

Anime films

Web anime
The Wings of Rean (2005) – Luxe Houjou
The King of Fighters: Destiny (2017–2018) – Mature
Sword Gai (2018) - Mina Haraya
7 Seeds (2019) – Ayu
Hero Mask (2019) – Tina Hurst

Video games
The Legend of Zelda: Skyward Sword (2011) – Princess Zelda
Toushin Toshi Girls Gift RPG (2014) – Serena
Tokyo Xanadu (2015) – Asuka Hiiragi
Assassin's Creed Syndicate (2015) – Evie Frye
Final Fantasy XV (2016) – Cindy Aurum
The Legend of Zelda: Breath of the Wild (2017) – Princess Zelda
Fate/Grand Order (2017) – Berserker of El Dorado/Penthesilea
BlazBlue: Cross Tag Battle (2018) – Blake Belladonna
The King of Fighters All Star (2018) - Mature
Azur Lane (2018) - Minneapolis
Devil May Cry 5 (2019) - Patty Lowell
The Alchemist Code (2019) - Ambrosia
The Last of Us Part II (2020) - Dina
Bravely Default 2 (2020) - Gloria
Hyrule Warriors: Age of Calamity (2020) – Princess Zelda
Blue Archive (2021) – Waraku Chise

Dubbing roles

Live-action

Animation

References

External links
Official agency profile 

1985 births
Living people
Japanese video game actresses
Japanese voice actresses
Ken Production voice actors
Voice actresses from Tokyo
21st-century Japanese actresses